Jessicka Rabid is a 2010 American horror film directed by Matthew Reel about an inbred, intellectually disabled girl who contracts rabies from a dog bite after years of being treated like a dog by her abusive, incestuous white trash family. A sequel, titled Jessicka Rabid 2: Infected, was slated for a 2014 release.

Plot
Jessicka (Elske McCain) is a mute and intellectually disabled young woman that lives with her cousins Marley (Trent Haaga) and Brad Hoffman (Jeff Sisson). They mistreat and abuse her on a regular basis, subjecting Jessicka to beatings and rape when they aren't locking her up in a dog cage and treating her like a pet. It's only after Jessicka is bitten by a rabid dog that she begins to turn on her cruel captors and the porn director they pimp her out to.

Cast

Reception
The Oklahoma Gazette panned Jessicka Rabid, stating that "This Troma pick-up really makes I Spit on Your Grave look like high art by comparison." DVD Talk gave a mixed review, stating that "Jessicka Rabid is not a film for everyone, or indeed for most people. Fans of the genre will find a lot to like, others very little."

References

External links

2010 films
2010 horror films
American horror thriller films
American independent films
Incest in film
Films about dysfunctional families
2010s exploitation films
Films about intellectual disability
Films about rape
Troma Entertainment films
2010 horror thriller films
2010 independent films
2010s English-language films
2010s American films